Glenorchy City Council (or City of Glenorchy) is a local government body in Tasmania, and one of the five municipalities that constitutes the Greater Hobart Area. The Glenorchy local government area has a population of 50,411, covering the suburbs north of central Hobart on the western shore of the Derwent River, including its namesake suburb, Glenorchy.

Mayors
Past mayors of the City of Glenorchy include:
Terry Martin Sr. (1964–1965)
Ken Lowrie (1965–1975)
David Shields (1983–1990)
Terry Martin (1990–2005)
Adriana Taylor (2005–2011)
Stuart Slade (2011–2014)
Kristie Johnston (2014–2021)
Bec Thomas (2021-)

Aldermen 

As of the 2022 Tasmanian Local Government Elections, the current makeup of the Glenorchy City Council is as follows:

History 

Tasmanian Aboriginals were the first inhabitants of the area where Glenorchy lies today. The first European to arrive in Glenorchy was a Frenchman, who was a member of Bruni d'Entrecasteaux's crew, in 1793. An English expedition arrived two months later, under the command of John Hayes. Hayes sailed up the river which he referred to as the Derwent. He named Prince of Wales Bay and called the area around New Town and Moonah King George's Plains. Hayes named the Glenorchy area as New Cumberland.

This French presence was the main influence in Lieutenant Governor Bowen's decision to settle where Hobart now exists.

The period between 1840 and 1860 was when steady growth was seen in Glenorchy, culminating in the area becoming a municipality in 1864. Glenorchy is believed to have been so named by governor Lachlan Macquarie after his wife's home in Scotland. The name means 'glen of tumbling waters'.

City status was given to Glenorchy on 24 October 1964, exactly one hundred years after it was first proclaimed a municipality.

Geography 
The city spans the area along the Derwent River, from just north of the Queens Domain in the south, to the Bridgewater Bridge and Causeway in the north, and extends west as far as the foothills of Mount Wellington.

Demographics 
The greater Hobart area has a population of around 222,000 as at the 2016 Census, with the city of Glenorchy local government area having a population of over 46,000. This makes Glenorchy the third most populated city in the greater area of Hobart.

Glenorchy is classified as urban, fringe and medium (UFM) under the Australian Classification of Local Governments.

Localities

Hobart suburbs
•	
•	
•	
•	
•	
•	
•	
•	
•	
•	
•	
•	
•	
•	
•	
•

Other localities
•	
•	
•

Road infrastructure 
A greater proportion of all roads found within the boundaries of Glenorchy are owned by the city itself with the two exceptions being Goodwood Road and the Brooker Highway which are owned and maintained by the Tasmanian Government.

Culture

Events 
The city hosts several annual events, including a regatta at Montrose Bay while at the showgrounds there is the annual Royal Hobart Show and the Hobart Cup at Tattersalls Park.

Entertainment 
Glenorchy has a huge amount of entertainment to offer, considering its size. Located on the main road there is the only ice rink in the greater area of Hobart, as well as a Village Cinemas complex at Glenorchy Central and a Zone Bowling center at Moonah and located in Derwent Park is Parsons Sports Centre which houses Hobart's only indoor Tennis court.

The Derwent Entertainment Centre provides the city with the opportunity to host many local and international artists. Artists who have played here include Dire Straits, INXS, Elton John, John Farnham, Kylie Minogue and Bob Dylan. The DEC is also used for expos, trade shows and sporting events.

The Moorilla Estate often holds musical performances during the period of summer. Artists who have played at this venue include Grinspoon, Paul Kelly and The Pretenders.

The Museum of Old and New Art (MONA) opened on the Moorilla estate in 2011, and quickly became a popular tourist attraction.

Sport 
KGV Oval is just one of the places where sport is played seriously within the city.

Education 

Senior secondary colleges and high schools in the Glenorchy area include St Virgil's College located in Austin's Ferry; Montrose Bay High School located in Rosetta; Cosgrove High School, Dominic College and Guilford Young College located close to the city center; and Claremont College slightly to the north at Claremont.

Shopping and retail 
The City of Glenorchy has the second largest shopping district in southern Tasmania (the largest being in Hobart).The city has three major commercial areas: Moonah, Glenorchy CBD and Claremont. Claremont has one main shopping center (Claremont Village) and a few retail outlets. Moonah has a shopping strip with a variety of small shops and cafes, as well as a Harris Scarfe department store and shopping centre Woolworths supermarket. The Glenorchy CBD has three major indoor shopping centres, Northgate Shopping Centre, Glenorchy Central (Centro), and Glenorchy Plaza.

See also
List of local government areas of Tasmania

References

External links 
 Glenorchy City Council official website
Local Government Association Tasmania
Tasmanian Electoral Commission - local government

Glenorchy
Geography of Hobart
Glenorchy, Tasmania
City of Glenorchy